Mamasa Regency is one of the six regencies that make up the West Sulawesi Province, Indonesia, on the island of Sulawesi. It covers a land area of 3,005.88 km2. The population was 140,082 at the 2010 Census and 163,383 at the 2020 Census. Its capital is the town of Mamasa. The Mamasa people - which is a sub-group of the Toraja people - form the most common ethnic group.

Mamasa Regency is located at an altitude of 600-2,000 meters above sea level.

History 
Mamasa Regency used to be part of Polewali Mamasa Regency, a former Indonesian Regency that used to be part of South Sulawesi but later became part of West Sulawesi province. In 2002, the regency was split into two smaller regencies: Polewali Mandar Regency which is located on the sea-side region, and Mamasa Regency on the mountain area. Polewali Mandar is mainly inhabited by the Mandar ethnic group, while Mamasa is home to the Mamasa people, who are related to the ethnic group Mamasa.

Sumarorong Airport
The airport developed from an airstrip to a 700-meter runway in 2012 and a predicted finish in 2013 with a 1,500-meter runway to facilitate wide-body aircraft.
The airport ceased operations in 2016 due to a lack of passengers, but in November 2020 the airport was re-opened again for flights.

Demographics

Population  
The total population of this regency in 2020 was 163,383 people, of which men were 83,928 and women were 79,455. The district is divided into 17 districts, and sub-divided into 13 urban villages (kelurahan) and 181 rural villages (desa). The original inhabitants of Mamasa Regency are the Mamasa people, which is a sub-group of the Toraja people. Because the province of West Sulawesi was a division of the province of South Sulawesi, some of the indigenous people of South Sulawesi also live in West Sulawesi, and their largest ethnic groups are the Bugis and Makassar. There are also other immigrant ethnic groups such as the Javanese and Balinese.

Religion 
Mamasa Regency has a diversity of ethnicities, religions, races and customs (SARA). Based on data from Central Statistics Agency, Mamasa Regency records data on religious diversity. The percentage of religions in the regency is based on data from the Ministry of Home Affairs 2020, namely 77.83% of the adherents of the Christian religion, where Protestant comprise 74.78% and Catholic 3.05%. Then comes the adherents of the Islamic religion who form as much as 17.30%, then Hindu as much as 1.53%, while about 3.34% of the population of Mamasa still adhere to the belief of Mappurondo. For houses of worship, there are 646 Protestant churches, 49 Catholic churches, 129 mosques, 19 prayer rooms, and 26 Pura buildings.

Administration 

The regency is divided into seventeen districts (kecamatan), listed below with their areas and their populations at the 2010 Census and the 2020 Census. The table also includes the locations of the district administrative centres.

Climate
Mamasa has a tropical rainforest climate (Af) that closely borders a subtropical highland climate (Cfb) with moderate rainfall in August and September and heavy rainfall in the remaining months.

See also
Gandang Dewata National Park
Polewali-Mamasa

References

Regencies of West Sulawesi
Torajan people